Yayladere is a town and seat of Yayladere District of Bingöl Province in Turkey. The mayor is Sabri Akyürek (CHP).

The town is populated by Kurds of the Giransor, Kubat and Lertik tribes and had a population of 1,020 in 2021.

Neighborhoods 
The town is divided into the neighborhoods of Akçadamlar, Conak, Haktanır, Hasköy, Merkez and Yolgüden.

History 
It had previously been a sanjak (district) of the Vilayet of Erzurum.

References

Populated places in Bingöl Province
Kurdish settlements in Bingöl Province
Yayladere District
Towns in Turkey